Jana Novotná and Arantxa Sánchez Vicario were the defending champions but did not compete that year.

Gigi Fernández and Natasha Zvereva won in the final 6–2, 6–1 against Alexia Dechaume-Balleret and Sandrine Testud.

Seeds
Champion seeds are indicated in bold text while text in italics indicates the round in which those seeds were eliminated. The top four seeded teams received byes into the second round.

Draw

Final

Top half

Bottom half

External links
 1995 Toshiba Classic Doubles draw

Southern California Open
1995 WTA Tour